Emil Łupiński (born 13 January 1996) is a Polish professional footballer who plays as a midfielder for Wissa Szczuczyn.

References

External links

1996 births
Living people
Association football midfielders
Polish footballers
Jagiellonia Białystok players
Olimpia Zambrów players
Ekstraklasa players
III liga players
Sportspeople from Białystok